Grigorovich M-15 (alternative designation ShCh M-15, sometimes also Shchetinin M-15) was a successful Russian World War I-era biplane flying boat, developed from the M-9 by Grigorovich.

Development
The M-15 was a smaller version of the M-9 intended to replace the latter, however it was only built in small numbers due to shortage of the more powerful Hispano-Suiza engines. After the summer of 1917 it was mostly used as a trainer.

Two M-15s fell into Finnish hands during the Russian Civil War, having been left at Åland and Turku. The Russian officer J.Herbert flew the Åland aircraft to mainland Finland and was awarded an officer's title in the Finnish Air Force. Only the Åland aircraft was in flyworthy condition. The aircraft was flown until 1919.

Variants
M-15Reconnaissance / skiplane powered by  Hispano-Suiza 8A engines.
M-17 the second prototype powered by a  Clerget 9B engine.
M-18 powered by a  Hispano-Suiza 8B engine.

Operators

Finnish Air Force

Imperial Russian Navy

Soviet Naval Aviation

Specifications (M-15)

References

Bibliography

Single-engined pusher aircraft
Flying boats
1910s Russian military reconnaissance aircraft
Biplanes
Military aircraft of World War I
M-15
Aircraft first flown in 1916